Yaya Seyba (born 1957) is a Malian sprinter. He competed in the men's 400 metres at the 1988 Summer Olympics.

References

External links
 

1957 births
Living people
Athletes (track and field) at the 1988 Summer Olympics
Malian male sprinters
Olympic athletes of Mali
Place of birth missing (living people)
21st-century Malian people